Houston, the largest city in Texas, is the site of 97 completed skyscrapers over , 50 of which stand taller than . The tallest building in the city is the JPMorgan Chase Tower, which rises  in Downtown Houston and was completed in 1982. It also stands as the tallest building in Texas and the 29th-tallest building in the United States. The second-tallest skyscraper in the city is the Wells Fargo Plaza, which rises  and was completed in 1983. The Williams Tower, completed in 1982 and rising , is the third-tallest building in Houston. Seven of the ten tallest buildings in Texas are located in Houston.

The history of skyscrapers in the city began with the construction of the original Binz Building in 1895. This building, rising 6 floors, is often regarded as the first skyscraper in Houston; it was demolished in 1951 to allow for the construction of a more modern building of the same name, which was in turn replaced by another, 14-floor-tall high-rise that also kept the original name. After the Texas real estate collapse in late 1980s, the city saw no new major office buildings until 2002, when 1500 Louisiana Street was completed. There are  four buildings under construction that are planned to rise at least .



Tallest buildings
This height includes spires and architectural details but does not include antenna masts.

Tallest under construction
, there are 8 buildings under construction in Houston that are planned to rise at least .

Timeline of tallest buildings

Since 1895, the year the first high-rise in the city was constructed, the title of the tallest building in Houston has been held by eleven high-rises.

See also 
 List of tallest buildings in Texas / the United States / the world
 List of tallest buildings in Austin
 List of tallest buildings in Dallas
 List of tallest buildings in Fort Worth
 List of tallest buildings in San Antonio 
  List of tallest buildings in Corpus Christi

Notes

References
General

 
Specific

External links
 Houston Skyscraper Diagram on SkyscraperPage

Houston
Houston
 
Tallest buildings